Larry Weber (born July 7, 1955) is an American entrepreneur and the founder, chairman & CEO of Racepoint Global, a communications agency headquartered in Boston, MA. He has served as CEO of both mid-and large-scale companies, and has founded several other public relations and interactive marketing agencies including The Weber Group, ThunderHouse and W2. His clients include AT&T, Boston Scientific, Coca-Cola, Deere, General Electric, General Motors, IBM, Kaiser Permanente, Microsoft, Panasonic, SAP, and Verizon Wireless. 

Weber co-founded the Massachusetts Innovation & Technology Exchange (MITX), and was Executive Chairman of the MITX Board of Directors. He also sits on the board of directors of Pegasystems, Inc. (PEGA) and the Clubhouse Network, and was on the board of Macromill Group, the Council of Competitiveness, and the Chair of the board of the Computer Museum. He is the author of several books including Authentic Marketing: How to Capture Hearts and Minds Through the Power of Purpose, published in 2019.

Career

The Weber Group 
Weber started his own public relations company, The Weber Group, in 1987, and shortly after launched Thunderhouse, an interactive marketing firm. Within 10 years, The Weber Group was the world's largest and most established technology public relations firm. Its clients included  Verizon Wireless, SAP, Microsoft, IBM, General Motors, Hewlett Packard, Citrix, AOL, and AT&T, among others.

Weber Shandwick and The Interpublic Group of Companies 
The Interpublic Group of Companies purchased The Weber Group in late 1996. During his time at IPG, Weber led the purchase of 21 public relations companies, among them Shandwick International, BSMG Worldwide, and GolinHarris. In 1999, Weber engineered the merger of Weber Shandwick and BSMG Worldwide to form the world's largest public relations firm, and the company became Weber Shandwick Worldwide. 

In early 2000, Weber was named chairman and CEO of Interpublic's Advanced Marketing Services group, a $3 billion unit including the company's public relations, research and analysis, and entertainment holdings.

The W2 Group and Racepoint Global 
After leaving Interpublic, he founded the W2 Group and Racepoint Group in 2004.

W2 Group 
The W2 Group was created as a holding company under which global marketing companies could be bought and CMOs advised. In 2007 it received its first funding round and in 2008 it had five companies. It was organized into three groups: the companies, the innovations, and the content.

Racepoint Global 
Racepoint, founded in 2004, is one of Massachusetts’ largest public relations firms, with clients that have included ARM, Dassault Systemes, Deere, Kaiser-Permanente, Forrester, Panasonic, and the Pittsburgh Steelers. Weber was the chairman and CEO of the firm. In 2013, Weber merged Racepoint with its sister company, Digital Influence Group, a social media marketing firm to create Racepoint Global.

Counseling governments 
In addition to counseling many tech brands on marketing and business strategy, Weber provided PR direction for governments including the Kingdom of Jordan, Libya, and Rwanda. He also led the marketing of the XO laptop by One Laptop per Child (OLPC). OLPC aims to provide laptops to school-age children all over the world. It has been introduced in Afghanistan, Haiti, Pakistan, Rwanda, and South Africa.  In 2008, Racepoint Group won the United Nations Grand Award for “excellence in communication” for its OLPC campaign. 

Weber is also a guest lecturer at Tuck School of Business at Dartmouth College.

Appointments 
Weber is on the board of Pegasystem and The Clubhouse Network. He was the co-founder of the Massachusetts Innovation and Technology Exchange (MITX), and served on the board as chairman. He was also on the executive committee of the Council on Competitiveness, the Macromill Group, and was chairman of the Computer Museum’s board of trustees.

Bibliography
As of 2019, Weber is the author of the following books:
Authentic Marketing: How to Capture Hearts and Minds Through the Power of Purpose. Wiley, 2019. 
The Digital Marketer: Ten New Skills You Must Learn to Stay Relevant and Customer-Centric. Wiley, 2014. 
Everywhere: Comprehensive Digital Business Strategy for the Social Media Era. Wiley, 2011. 
Sticks and Stones: How Digital Business Reputations Are Created Over Time and Lost in a Click. Wiley, 2009. 
 Marketing to the Social Web. Wiley, 2007; second edition 2009. 
The Provocateur. Crown, 2002.

External links
Racepoint Global

References

American business writers
Writers from Ohio
Living people
1955 births